The Southern Angami Public Organization is a public organization established in 1944. It is the apex public organization of the Southern Angami Nagas. 

Its main objective is to protect and safeguard the territories of the Southern Angamis.

History
In 1934, 9 villages in the region came together as Japfüphiki. In 1944, the present 13 villages formed the Southern Angami Public Organization.

References

Ethnic organisations based in India
Naga people